Aleksandr Ivanik (born 26 February 1968) is a Russian sprint canoeist who competed from the early 1990s to the mid-2000s. He won eleven medals at the ICF Canoe Sprint World Championships with four golds (K-4 200 m: 1997, K-4 500 m: 1993, 2001; K-4 1000 m: 1994), three silvers (K-2 200 m: 1999, 2001; K-4 500 m: 1999), and four bronzes (K-4 500 m: 2003, K-4 1000 m: 1993, 1998, 2001).

Ivanik also competed in two Summer Olympics, but was eliminated in the semifinals for both games (1996: K-2 1000 m, 2000: K-2 500 m).

References

1968 births
Canoeists at the 1996 Summer Olympics
Canoeists at the 2000 Summer Olympics
Living people
Olympic canoeists of Russia
Russian male canoeists
ICF Canoe Sprint World Championships medalists in kayak